Tootool is a rural community in the central east part of the Riverina.  It is situated by road, about 4 kilometres east of French Park and 16 kilometres west of The Rock.

Tootool Post Office opened on 1 August 1901 and closed in 1966.

Notes and references

Towns in the Riverina
Towns in New South Wales